Charlotte Frank (born 25 July 1959, Kiel) is a German architect and partner at Schultes Frank Architekten in Berlin. In 2003, together with others, she was awarded the German Architecture Prize for the new German Chancellery in Berlin. She has worked with Axel Schultes on other projects, including the Kunstmuseum Bonn (1992).

Completed works 
 German Chancellery, Berlin

Reception 
 German Architecture Prize for the new German Chancellery in Berlin.

References

Literature
Mönninger, Michael, and Charlotte Frank. Kanzleramt Berlin = Chancellery Berlin. Edited by Axel Menges, Stuttgart, 2002. .
Schultes, Axel, and Max Bächer. Kunstmuseum Bonn. Ernst und Sohn, 1994. .

External links
Schultes Frank Architeken

1959 births
21st-century German architects
German women architects
Living people
People from Kiel
21st-century German women